RTPA or rtPA may refer to:
Radiotelevisión del Principado de Asturias, a public broadcasting company in Asturias, Spain
Real-time process algebra, a set of new mathematical notations for formally describing system architectures, and static and dynamic behaviors
Recombinant tissue plasminogen activator, a protein involved in the breakdown of blood clots
Release to Production Acceptance, (in IT systems management) a methodology used to consistently and successfully deploy application systems into a production environment regardless of platform.